is a Japanese television drama series and the 104th Asadora series, following Ochoyan. It premiered on May 17, 2021 and concluded on October 29, 2021.

Plot 

Born in September 1995, Momone Nagaura lived with her parents, grandfather, and sister in Kesennuma City, Miyagi Prefecture. After failing her college entrance exams, she went to live with her grandfather's acquaintance who is a forest guide in Tome City. Momone's life changed when she met a popular weather forecaster from Tokyo who taught her how weather forecasts can predict the future. She decides to study hard and be a weather forecaster.

Cast

Nagaura's family 

 Kaya Kiyohara as Momone Nagaura (her nickname was Monet)
 Seiyō Uchino as Kōji Nagaura, Momone's father
 Kyōka Suzuki as Ayako Nagaura, Momone's mother
 Aju Makita as Michi Nagaura, Momone's younger sister
 Tatsuya Fuji as Tatsumi Nagaura, Momone's grandfather
 Keiko Takeshita as Masayo Nagaura, Momone's grandmother (also as narrator)

Momone's classmate and families 

 Ren Nagase (King & Prince) as Ryō Oikawa, Momone's classmate
 Yuri Tsunematsu as Asumi Nomura, Momone's childhood friend
 Kōki Maeda as Mitsuo Gotō, Momone's classmate
 Hyuga Takada as Yūto Hayasaka, Momone's classmate
 Tadanobu Asano as Shinji Oikawa, Ryō's father
 Maki Sakai as Minami Oikawa, Ryō's mother
 Reiko Kusamura as Fumie, Ryō's grandmother

Tome and Kesennuma people 

 Mari Natsuki as Sayaka Nitta, a wealthy woman
 Kentaro Sakaguchi as Kōtarō Suganami, an young doctor in an clinic
 Kenta Hamano as Shōyō Sasaki, the chief of a forestry union
 Denden as Hiroshi Kawakubo, an old staff at forestry union
 Shinya Tsukamoto as Kazuhisa Tanaka, an master at jazz cafe
 Yusuke Hirayama as Nobuhiro Nakayama, an doctor in a clinic
 Kōichi Yamadera as Katsutoshi Endō
 Sayaka Yamaguchi as Mikako Takahashi
 Mizuki Kayashima as Ichika Mizuno
 Aoi Itō as Akari Ishii
 Norihiko Tsukuda as Shigeki Koyama
 Daikichi Sugawara as Jirō Ōta

Tokyo people

People at weather forecast company 

 Hidetoshi Nishijima as Satoru Asaoka, a weather anchor
 Mio Imada as Riko Marianna Jinno, a news anchor
 Hiroya Shimizu as Mamoru Uchida, an employee
 Misato Morita a Midori Nosaka, an employee
 Jun Inoue as Kazumasa Anzai, the company's president

Others 

 Reo Tamaoki as Kōhei Sawatari, a reporter in charge at Japan Meteorological Agency
 Saki Takaoka as Satoko Takamura, a meteorological desk at television station
 Maiko as Natsu Inoue, a Tokyo boardinghouse landlady
 Koharu Sugawara as Yūki Samejima, an wheelchair marathon athlete

Production 
NHK announced the program would premiere on May 17, 2021 after Ochoyan ended.

References

External links 
 Official website (in Japanese)

2021 Japanese television series debuts
2021 Japanese television series endings
Asadora
Drama television series about the 2011 Tōhoku earthquake and tsunami
Television shows set in Miyagi Prefecture
Television shows set in Tokyo